Ananyashree Birla (born 17 July 1994) is an Indian singer, songwriter and entrepreneur. Since her debut single in 2016, Birla has reached more than 350 million combined streams and collaborated with artists including Sean Kingston, Afrojack, and Mood Melodies. Birla is the first Indian artist with an English language single to go platinum in India; five of her singles have achieved platinum or double platinum status.

In 2020, Birla became the first Indian to sign with Maverick Management in Los Angeles and released “Let There Be Love” and “Everybody's Lost” becoming the first Indian artiste to be featured on American national top 40 pop radio show, Sirius XM Hits.

Birla is the founder of Svatantra Microfin, a company that provides microfinance to women in rural India. She is also the founder of Ikai Asai and cofounder of Mpower. Birla has received awards for her work and entrepreneurship, including the ET Panache Trendsetters of 2016 award for Young Business Person and was listed as one of GQs Most Influential Indians of 2018.

In 2020, she launched the Ananya Birla Foundation to support: mental health, equality, education, financial inclusion, climate change and humanitarian relief efforts. She is the daughter of Kumar Mangalam Birla, an Indian industrialist and the chairman of the Aditya Birla Group and sister to Indian cricketer Aryaman Birla (see Birla family)

Early life 
Ananyashree Birla developed an interest in music at an early age, learning to play the santoor at the age of eleven. She studied economics and management at the University of Oxford for her bachelor's degree, but dropped out without completing her degree.

Career

Music career 
While at university, Birla started singing and playing the guitar at pubs and clubs. She also began writing her own music. Her debut single, "Livin’ the Life", was co-written, and produced, by JimBeanz (who previously collaborated with Nelly Furtado, Cheryl Tweedy and Demi Lovato) and was recorded and produced at a studio in Philadelphia. A remix by Dutch DJ Afrojack of "Livin’ the Life" makes Birla the first Indian artiste to get a worldwide release through PM:AM Recordings and hit over 14 million views on YouTube as of June 2017. Her songs have been topping the music charts in 2019.

She released her next single "Meant to be" in July 2017 which was subsequently certified Platinum as per the Indian Music Industry (IMI) recognised criteria for certifications. This makes Birla the first Indian artiste with an English single to go platinum. In January 2017, she supported Coldplay at the Global Citizen Festival.

She released her single "Hold On" on 1 March 2018. On 7 June 2018, she released her fourth single "Circles". On 17 January 2019, she released her 5th single and 1st song of 2019 "Better", which was viewed 4 million times on YouTube within 2 days of its release.

She released her debut EP Fingerprint in May 2019, via UMG and Island Records UK. It included "Blackout" featuring Vector and Wurld, which was one of the first collaborations between major artists from India and Nigeria.

In September 2019, Birla released ‘Day Goes By’ with Sean Kingston, who she met when they toured in India together. The song marked one of the first major pop collaborations between a US and Indian artist. The video has been viewed over 10 million times on YouTube.

In 2020 she signed with Maverick Management in Los Angeles. Later that year, she released “Let There Be Love” and “Everybody's Lost” becoming the first Indian artiste to be featured on an American national top 40 pop radio show, Sirius XM Hits.

She has performed at some of the biggest music events in Asia including Global Citizen, Oktoberfest, and Sunburn, Asia's biggest electronic music festival, and has toured with Wiz Khalifa.

Birla's "Hindustani Way" is the official CHEER SONG for the Indian Olympic at the 2021 Olympics, composed by A. R. Rahman.

Business career 
Birla founded Svatantra Microfin Private Limited at the age of 17. The organisation makes small loans to women entrepreneurs based in rural India. Under her leadership, Svatantra won the Gold Award for Best Start-Up (Skoch Financial Inclusion and Deepening Awards, 2014), Spirituality @ Work: Sach Bharat Samman (Sach Bharat Confluence 2015) and has maintained a quality loan portfolio, offering one of the lowest interest rates in the country.

In 2016, Birla became the founder and CEO of Ikai Asai, an inventory-based global luxury e-Commerce platform. The same year, Forbes named her one of Asia's Women to Watch.

Acting career 
In 2022, Birla made her acting debut after being featured in the song "Inaam" from Rudra: The Edge of Darkness, a streaming television series. She made her full-fledged acting debut in 2023, with in a spy thriller titled Shlok: The Desi Sherloc, directed by Kunal Kohli.

Campaign work 
While in England, Birla became aware of a student helpline that helped young people suffering from anxiety and depression. After university, she returned to India and, along with her mother, set up a mental health initiative called MPower aiming to stamp out the stigma towards people with mental illness across India. MPower is also responsible for opening a treatment centre for children suffering from mental health conditions.

In 2020, in response the COVID-19 pandemic, Mpower tied up with the Government of Maharashtra and Brihanmumbai Municipal Corporation (BMC) to launch a 24x7 free helpline. 45 thousand people had called within 2 months of the launch.

She is an ambassador for the National Alliance on Mental Illness, the United States’ largest grassroots mental health organisation dedicated to building better lives for the millions of Americans affected by mental illness.

She launched the Ananya Birla Foundation in 2020 with a COVID-19 relief project that involved providing menstruation kits, PPE kits and protective equipment to women and hospitals across Maharashtra. The Foundation also worked in providing essentials to migrant workers during the pandemic.

Personal life 
Ananya Birla is the eldest child of the sixth richest Indian – Kumar Mangalam Birla (Chairman of Aditya Birla Group) and Neerja Birla and the sixth generation scion of the Birla family. Birla family's place of origin is Pilani, Rajasthan.

Discography

Extended plays

Singles

References

External links 
 Ananya Birla's official website

Indian women pop singers
Indian women singer-songwriters
Indian singer-songwriters
1994 births
Living people
Indian women company founders
Indian microfinance people
Place of birth missing (living people)
Businesswomen from Maharashtra
Businesspeople from Mumbai
Women musicians from Maharashtra
Singers from Mumbai
21st-century Indian singers
21st-century Indian women singers
Birla family